Mona Mitterwallner (born 9 January 2002) is an Austrian professional cross-country mountain biker. She notably won the 2021 UCI Mountain Bike Marathon World Championships.

Major results

2018
 1st  Cross-country, UEC European Junior Championships
2019
 1st  Cross-country, National Junior Championships
 2nd  Cross-country, UCI World Junior Championships
 2nd  Cross-country, UEC European Junior Championships
2020
 1st  Cross-country, UCI World Junior Championships
 1st  Cross-country, UEC European Junior Championships
 1st  Cross-country, National Championships
2021
 1st  Marathon, UCI World Championships
 1st  Cross-country, UCI World Under-23 Championships
 1st  Cross-country, UEC European Under-23 Championships
 1st  Cross-country, National Championships
 1st  Overall UCI Under-23 XCO World Cup
1st Albstadt
1st Nové Město
1st Leogang
1st Les Gets
1st Lenzerheide
1st Snowshoe
 Swiss Bike Cup
1st Leukerbad
 Internazionali d’Italia Series
2nd Andora
3rd Nals
 French Cup
3rd Lons-le-Saunier
2022
 1st  Cross-country, National Championships
 Internazionali d’Italia Series
1st Nals
 UCI XCO World Cup
2nd Vallnord
2nd Mont-Sainte-Anne
3rd Albstadt
2023
 Shimano Super Cup Massi
2nd Banyoles

References

External links

Austrian female cyclists
Living people
2002 births
UCI Mountain Bike World Champions (women)
Austrian mountain bikers
Cross-country mountain bikers
21st-century Austrian women